The Compact Toroidal Hybrid (CTH) is an experimental device at Auburn University that uses magnetic fields to confine high-temperature plasmas. CTH is a torsatron type of stellarator with an external, continuously wound helical coil that generates the bulk of the magnetic field for containing a plasma.

Background 

Toroidal magnetic confinement fusion devices create magnetic fields that lie in a torus. These magnetic fields consist of two components, one component points in the direction that goes the long way around the torus (the toroidal direction), while the other component points in the direction that is the short way around the torus (the poloidal direction).  The combination of the two components creates a helically shaped field.  (You might imagine taking a flexible stick of candy cane and connecting the two ends.)   Stellarator type devices generate all required magnetic fields with external magnetic coils. This is different from tokamak devices where the toroidal magnetic field is generated by external coils and the poloidal magnetic field is produced by an electrical current flowing through the plasma.

The CTH device
The main magnetic field in CTH is generated by a continuously wound helical coil. An auxiliary set of ten coils produces a toroidal field much like that of a tokamak.  This toroidal field is used to vary the rotational transform of the confining magnetic field structure.  CTH typically operates at a magnetic field of 0.5 to 0.6 tesla at the center of the plasma.  CTH can be operated as a pure stellarator, but also has ohmic heating transformer system to drive electrical current in the plasma.  This current produces a poloidal magnetic field that, in addition to heating the plasma, changes the rotational transform of the magnetic field.  CTH researchers study how well the plasma is confined while they vary the source of rotational transform from external coils to plasma current.

The CTH vacuum vessel is made of Inconel 625, which has a higher electrical resistance and lower magnetic permeability than stainless steel.  
Plasma formation and heating is achieved using 14 GHz, 10 kW electron cyclotron resonance heating (ECRH). A 200 kW gyrotron has recently been installed on CTH. Ohmic heating on CTH has an input power of 100 kW.

Operations
 Plasmas electron temperatures are typically up to 200 electronvolts with electron densities up to 5 m−3.
 Plasmas last between 60 ms and 100 ms
 It takes 6 min-7 min to store enough energy to power the magnet coils

Subsystems
The following gives a list of subsystems needed for CTH operation.

 a set of 10 GE752 motors with attached 1-ton flywheels to store energy and produce currents for magnetic field generation
 two 18 GHz klystrons for Electron cyclotron resonance heating
 gyrotron for 2nd harmonic Electron cyclotron resonance heating
 a 2 kV, 50 μF capacitor bank and a 1 kV, 3 F capacitor bank to power the ohmic system
 a 640 channel data acquisition system

Diagnostics
The CTH has a large set of diagnostics to measure properties of plasma and magnetic fields. The following gives a list of major diagnostics.

 4-channel Interferometer for electron density measurements
 two color soft-X-ray camera for tomography and temperature profile
 soft x-ray spectrometer
 hard x-ray detector
 Coils for measuring Mirnov oscillations in the plasma
 Rogowski coils for determining plasma current
 Passive spectroscopy for temperature and density measurements, and tungsten erosion diagnostic measurements
 Langmuir probe (triple)

V3FIT

V3FIT is a code to reconstruct the equilibrium between the plasma and confining magnetic field in cases where the magnetic field is toroidal in nature, but not axisymmetric as is the case with tokamak equilibria. Because stellarators are non-axisymmetric, the CTH group uses the V3FIT and VMEC codes for reconstructing equilibria.  The V3FIT code uses as inputs the currents in the magnetic confinement coils, the plasma current, and data from the various diagnostics such as the Rogowski coils, SXR cameras, and interferometer.  The output of the V3FIT code includes the structure of the magnetic field, and profiles of the plasma current, density, and SXR emissivity.  Data from the CTH experiment was and continues to be used as a testbed for the V3FIT code which has also used for equilibrium reconstruction on the Helically Symmetric eXperiment (HSX), Large Helical Device (LHD), and Wendelstein 7-X (W7-X) stellarators, and the Reversed-Field eXperiment (RFX) and Madison Symmetric Torus (MST) reversed field pinches.

Goals and major achievements
CTH has made and continues to make fundamental contributions to the physics of current carrying stellarators. CTH researchers have studied disruption limits and characterizations as a function of the externally applied rotational transform (due to external magnet coils) for:

 Low safety factor (low-q) tokamak-like disruption avoidance
 Vertical displacement events (VDEs)

Ongoing experiments
CTH students and staff work on a number of experimental and computational research projects. Some of these are solely in house while others are in collaboration with other universities and national laboratories in the United States and abroad.  Current research projects include:
 Density limit studies as a function of the vacuum rotational transform
 Using spectroscopic techniques to measure tungsten erosion with the DIII-D group
 Measuring plasma flows with a Coherence Imaging system on CTH and on the W-7X stellarator
 Heavy ion transport studies on the W-7X stellarator
 Studying transition regions between fully ionized and neutrally dominated plasmas
 Implementation of a 4th channel for the interferometer system
 2nd harmonic electron cyclotron resonance heating with a gyrotron

History 

CTH is the third torsatron device to be built at Auburn University. Previous Magnetic Confinement Devices built at the university were:

The Auburn Torsatron (1983–1990)
The Auburn Torsatron had an l=2, m=10 helical coil.  The vacuum vessel had a major radius was Ro = 0.58 m with a minor radius of av=0.14 m. The magnetic field strength was |B| ≤ 0.2 T and plasmas were formed with ECRH using a 2.45 GHz magnetron taken from a microwave oven.  The Auburn Torsatron was used to study basic plasma physics and diagnostics, and magnetic surface mapping techniques

The Compact Auburn Torsatron (1990–2000)
The Compact Auburn Torsatron (CAT) had two helical coils, an l=1,m=5 and an l=2,m=5 whose currents could be controlled independently.  Varying the relative currents between the helical coils modified the rotational transform.  The vacuum vessel major radius was Ro = 0.53 m with a plasma minor radius of av=0.11 m. The steady state magnetic field strength was |B| 0.1 T.  CAT plasmas were formed with ECRH using a low ripple, 6 kW, 2.45 GHz magnetron source.  CAT was used to study magnetic islands, magnetic island minimization, and driven plasma rotations

Other Stellarators
Below is a list of other Stellarators in the US and around the world: 
 Wendelstein 7-X in Greifswald Germany
 The Large Helical Device (LDH) in Japan
 The National Compact Stellarator Experiment (NCSX) - A device designed and partially built at Princeton Plasma Physics Laboratory (PPPL)
 The Helically Symmetric Experiment at the University of Wisconsin - Madison
 The Hybrid Illinois Device for Research and Applications (HIDRA) experiment at the University of Illinois
 The Columbia Non-neutral Torus (CNT) at Columbia University in New York
 The Heliotron J experiment in Japan
 The TJ-II in Spain
 The Stellarator of Costa Rica (SCR-1)
 Uragan-2M in the Ukraine

References

External links
 CTH website
 Physics Department
 Auburn University

Plasma physics
Stellarators
Auburn University